Neptis vindo, or Claude's club-dot sailer, is a butterfly in the family Nymphalidae. It is found in Ivory Coast.

The larvae feed on Lasiodiscus species.

References

Butterflies described in 1978
vindo
Endemic fauna of Ivory Coast
Butterflies of Africa